Bertram H. "B. H." Born (June 6, 1932 – February 3, 2013) was an American basketball center. After graduating from Medicine Lodge High School in 1950, he played for the Kansas Jayhawks from 1951 to 1954.

College career
During the 1951–52 season, in which Kansas earned a berth in the championship game of the NCAA tournament, Born was a reserve behind Clyde Lovellette, averaging 1.6 points per game. The following season, he had 18.9 points per game for the Jayhawks as the team reached the NCAA tournament final. Indiana defeated Kansas 69–68 in the championship game, but Born won the tournament's Most Outstanding Player award. During the final, Born scored 26 points, compiled 15 rebounds, and blocked 13 shots.

International and AAU career
Born posted an average of 19 points per game in the 1953–54 season, and competed for the U.S. national team in the 1954 FIBA World Championship. At that tournament, he scored 10.4 points per game in nine appearances and had a 12-point performance in a 62–41 U.S. win over Brazil that clinched the gold medal for the American team. The Fort Wayne Pistons selected Born with the 22nd overall pick of the 1954 NBA draft. However, he did not join the team. In the mid-1950s, he played for the Peoria Caterpillars Amateur Athletic Union (AAU) team, and he was named an AAU All-American in 1957 and 1958. With Born, the Caterpillars won the AAU championship twice. In addition, he helped the Jayhawks recruit Wilt Chamberlain, a leading high school player at the time. In Peoria, Illinois, Born was employed with Caterpillar Inc.'s tractor business for 43 years.

Honors
In 1992, the University of Kansas retired Born's jersey, 23. He has also been inducted into the Kansas Sports Hall of Fame.

Death
Born died on February 3, 2013, in Peoria.

References

External links
 The draft review: B. H. Born

1932 births
2013 deaths
American men's basketball players
Basketball players from Kansas
Centers (basketball)
FIBA World Championship-winning players
Fort Wayne Pistons draft picks
Kansas Jayhawks men's basketball players
People from Osawatomie, Kansas
Peoria Caterpillars players
Sportspeople from the Kansas City metropolitan area
United States men's national basketball team players